Ashokan may refer to:

Places
 Ashokan Center, a Catskills outdoor education center and retreat facility
 Ashokan Reservoir, part of the New York City watershed

People

Ashokan
 Ashokan (304–232 BCE), Indian emperor
 Ashokan (actor), actor in Malayalam cinema
 Ashokan (film director) (1961/62–2022), director in Malayalam cinema
 Gayathri Ashokan (born 1957), poster designer for Malayalam films
 Harisree Ashokan (born 1964), actor in Malayalam cinema
 S. A. Ashokan (fl. 1958–1982), actor in Tamil cinema

Asokan
S. S. Asokan, Singaporean convicted murderer

Asogan
Asogan Ramesh Ramachandren, Singaporean convicted murderer

Other uses
 Ashokan Edicts in Delhi
 "Ashokan Farewell", a song

See also
 Ashoka (disambiguation)